Airport Drive may refer to:

Highways
 Airport Drive (Melbourne), Australia
 Airport Drive (Perth), Australia
 Virginia State Route 156 and Virginia State Route 281, both part of the same stretch of road named Airport Drive

Towns
 Airport Drive, Missouri, United States, a village

See also
 Airport Boulevard (disambiguation)
 Airport Road (disambiguation)